is a city located in Ibaraki Prefecture, Japan. , the city had an estimated population of 39,072 in 13,721 households and a population density of 217 persons per km². The percentage of the population aged over 65 was 34.3%.

Geography
Located in central-western Ibaraki Prefecture, Sakuragawa is bordered by Tochigi Prefecture to the north. The city is lined by mountains along its east side, named Tomiya, Amabiki, Kaba and Ashio, from north to south. Mt. Tsukuba dominates the southern side, although it is not located within the borders of the city. The eponymous Sakuragawa River has its source in the Iwase area of the city.

Surrounding municipalities
Ibaraki Prefecture
 Kasama
 Ishioka
 Tsukuba
 Chikusei
Tochigi Prefecture
Mashiko
Mooka
Motegi

Climate
Sakuragawa has a Humid continental climate (Köppen Cfa) characterized by warm summers and cool winters with light snowfall.  The average annual temperature in Sakuragawa is 13.5 °C. The average annual rainfall is 1355 mm with September as the wettest month. The temperatures are highest on average in August, at around 25.5 °C, and lowest in January, at around 2.5 °C.

Demographics
Per Japanese census data, the population of Sakuragawa has declined in recent decades.

History
The city of Sakuragawa was established on October 1, 2005, from the merger of the towns of Iwase (in the north), Makabe (in the south) with the village of Yamato (in the center). Iwase was formerly from Nishiibaraki District, while Makabe and Yamato were formerly from Makabe District.

Government
Sakuragawa has a mayor-council form of government with a directly elected mayor and a unicameral city council of 18 members. Sakuragawa contributes one member to the Ibaraki Prefectural Assembly. In terms of national politics, the city is part of Ibaraki 1st district of the lower house of the Diet of Japan.

Economy
The economy of Sakuragawa is primarily agricultural. Stone quarrying is also important.

Education
Sakuragawa has nine public elementary schools and four public middle schools operated by the city government, and two public high schools operated by the Ibaraki Prefectural Board of Education. There is also one private middle school and one private high school.

Transportation

Railway
 JR East –  Mito Line
  -  -

Highway
  – Sakuragawa-Nishi Interchange

Local attractions
Makabe old town with 104 buildings listed as Registered Tangible Cultural Properties
 Amibiki Kannon
 Makabe Doll Festival
 "Tsukuba Ring-Ring Road" – a bicycle road connecting Iwase to Tsukuba along a former railway line.

Noted people from Sakuragawa
Tamon Hasegawa, politician
Megu Sakuragawa, voice actress

References

External links

Official Website 

 
Cities in Ibaraki Prefecture